Hengel, or Van Hengel, is a surname that may refer to:
Maarten van Hengel (1920s-2006)
Dave Hengel (born 1961), American Major League Baseball outfielder
Drusilla van Hengel (born 1963), American sprint canoer
Ed Hengel (1855–1927), American Major League Baseball manager
Guy Vanhengel (born 1958), Belgian politician
John van Hengel (1923–2005), American activist - related to Geert Schutte van Hengel 
Maarten R. van Hengel (born 1953) American Financial Executive 
Van Hengel (Dutch regent family 1600-present)